Bayview Community School is located in Mahone Bay, Nova Scotia. It was built on a reclaimed marsh in September, 2000.

There are 430 students currently enrolled in the school from primary (or kindergarten) to grade 9. The principal is Lamar Eason, who was previously the vice principal of the Mahone Bay school.

Achievements 
Bayview Community School has won the following regional championships.
 2001-2002 Junior Girls Basketball Champions
 2002-2003 Junior Girls Basketball Champions
 2004-2005 Junior Girls Basketball Champions
 2007-2008 Junior Boys Champion Soccer, Junior Champions Badminton, Junior Boys Softball Champions
 2009-2010 Junior Champions Badminton, Junior Girls Cross Country Champions, Junior Boys Basketball Champions
 2010-2011 Junior Boys Soccer Champions, Junior Boys Cross Country Champions, Junior Boys Basketball Champions, Junior Girls Track and Field Champions, Junior Girls Volleyball Champions, Junior Boys Volleyball
 2014-2015 Girls Wrestling Regional Champions

References

Schools in Lunenburg County, Nova Scotia
Elementary schools in Nova Scotia